WXQR-FM (105.5 MHz) is a radio station broadcasting a Regional Mexican format. Originally based in Jacksonville, North Carolina, the station is headquartered in New Bern.

History
WXQR-FM is one of the oldest rock stations in America. It was known as "The Rock and Roll Animal" from the 1970s until the mid-1990s. The station was once owned by Sidney Popkin, a member of one of the most prominent families in Jacksonville. During the 1980s and 1990s, the station was headquartered on New Bridge Street near downtown Jacksonville, in what was once the Iwo Jima Theater. Because of its location, it was a favorite for decades among Marines stationed at Camp Lejeune. The station operated with 3,000 watts of power, which put them at a competitive disadvantage against its Newport-based rival Z-103, but WXQR had a solid following of loyal listeners.  When Z-103 finally switched to Adult Contemporary (WMGV), New Bern's WSFL-FM became WXQR's main competition; however, WXQR-FM wasn't competitive with WSFL until its power was increased in the mid-1990s. HVS Partners, WXQR-FM's longtime owners, sold the station in the mid-1990s to Cumulus, who then sold it to NextMedia Group a few years later.  From October 2010 to January 2012, it simulcast to inland areas on WQZL/101.1.

NextMedia sold WXQR-FM and their 32 other radio stations to Digity, LLC for $85 million; the transaction was consummated on February 10, 2014.

Effective February 25, 2016, Digity, LLC and its 124 radio stations were acquired by Alpha Media for $264 million.

In September 2017, Dick Broadcasting announced the purchase of Alpha Media stations in three markets — 18 stations and two translators in total, at a purchase price of $19.5 million. The acquisition of WXQR-FM by Dick Broadcasting was consummated on December 20, 2017.

On August 2, 2021, WXQR-FM changed their format from active rock to Regional Mexican, branded as "La Pantera 105.5".  “Rock 105" had broadcast for more than 40 years and was the "original rock station" for the Carolina Coast. The previous Rock format continued as a live stream until Tuesday night January 31, 2023 at the stroke of midnight when it signed off for a final time with The Doors “ The End”.

References

External links
La Pantera 105.5 official website

XQR-FM
Regional Mexican radio stations in the United States
Spanish-language radio stations in North Carolina